Thaisella kiosquiformis is a species of sea snail, a marine gastropod mollusk, in the family Muricidae, the murex snails or rock snails.

Description
The length of the shell attains 37 mm.

Distribution
This marine species occurs off Panama.

References

 Claremont, M., Vermeij, G. J., Williams, S. T. & Reid, D. G. (2013). Global phylogeny and new classification of the Rapaninae (Gastropoda: Muricidae), dominant molluscan predators on tropical rocky seashores. Molecular Phylogenetics and Evolution. 66: 91–102.

External links
 Duclos (P. L.). (1832). Description de quelques espèces de pourpres, servant de type à six sections établies dans ce genre. Annales des Sciences Naturelles. 26: 103-112

kiosquiformis
Gastropods described in 1832